Datchet Common near Datchet in the English county of Berkshire (formerly Buckinghamshire) was used as a cricket venue for matches between 1730 and 1785.

It is first recorded in October 1730 when a match was played "by persons of distinction for £50 a side". This match is the earliest known mention of cricket in the county of Buckinghamshire.

References

1730 establishments in England
Buckinghamshire
Cricket grounds in Buckinghamshire
Cricket in Buckinghamshire
Defunct cricket grounds in England
Defunct sports venues in Buckinghamshire
English cricket venues in the 18th century
History of Buckinghamshire
Sport in Buckinghamshire
Sports venues completed in 1730
Sports venues in Buckinghamshire
Datchet